Qeshlaq-e Khan Goldi Hajj Ahmad (also Romanized as Qeshlāq-e Khān Goldī Ḩājj Aḩmad) is a village in Qeshlaq-e Sharqi Rural District, Qeshlaq Dasht District, Bileh Savar County, Ardabil Province, Iran. At the 2006 census, its population was 21, in 6 families.

References 

Towns and villages in Bileh Savar County